Apigenin (4′,5,7-trihydroxyflavone), found in many plants, is a natural product belonging to the flavone class that is the aglycone of several naturally occurring glycosides. It is a yellow crystalline solid that has been used to dye wool.

Sources in nature
Apigenin is found in many fruits and vegetables, but parsley, celery, celeriac, and chamomile tea are the most common sources. Apigenin is particularly abundant in the flowers of chamomile plants, constituting 68% of total flavonoids. Dried parsley can contain about 45 mg apigenin/gram of the herb, and dried chamomile flower about 3-5 mg/gram. The apigenin content of fresh parsley is reportedly 215.5 mg/100 grams, which is much higher than the next highest food source, green celery hearts providing 19.1 mg/100 grams.

Biosynthesis 
Apigenin is biosynthetically derived from the general phenylpropanoid pathway and the flavone synthesis pathway. The phenylpropanoid pathway starts from the aromatic amino acids L-phenylalanine or L-tyrosine, both products of the Shikimate pathway.  When starting from L-phenylalanine, first the amino acid is non-oxidatively deaminated by phenylalanine ammonia lyase (PAL) to make cinnamate, followed by oxidation at the para position by cinnamate 4-hydroxylase (C4H) to produce p-coumarate. As L-tyrosine is already oxidized at the para position, it skips this oxidation and is simply deaminated by tyrosine ammonia lyase (TAL) to arrive at p-coumarate. To complete the general phenylpropanoid pathway, 4-coumarate CoA ligase (4CL) substitutes coenzyme A (CoA) at the carboxy group of p-coumarate. Entering the flavone synthesis pathway, the type III polyketide synthase enzyme chalcone synthase (CHS) uses consecutive condensations of three equivalents of malonyl CoA followed by aromatization to convert p-coumaroyl-CoA to chalcone. Chalcone isomerase (CHI) then isomerizes the product to close the pyrone ring to make naringenin. Finally, a flavanone synthase (FNS) enzyme oxidizes naringenin to apigenin. Two types of FNS have previously been described; FNS I, a soluble enzyme that uses 2-oxogluturate, Fe2+, and ascorbate as cofactors and FNS II, a membrane bound, NADPH dependent cytochrome p450 monooxygenase.

Glycosides 
The naturally occurring glycosides formed by the combination of apigenin with sugars include:

 Apiin (apigenin 7-O-apioglucoside), isolated from parsley and celery
 Apigetrin (apigenin 7-glucoside), found in dandelion coffee
 Vitexin (apigenin 8-C-glucoside)
 Isovitexin (apigenin 6-C-glucoside)
 Rhoifolin (apigenin 7-O-neohesperidoside)
 Schaftoside (apigenin 6-C-glucoside 8-C-arabinoside)

See also 
 Amentoflavone

References 

Aromatase inhibitors
Delta-opioid receptor antagonists
Flavones
GABAA receptor positive allosteric modulators
Resorcinols
Kappa-opioid receptor antagonists
Mu-opioid receptor antagonists
NMDA receptor antagonists
Phytoestrogens
Progestogens
Vinylogous carboxylic acids